Christopher Mark Sievey (25 August 1955 – 21 June 2010) was an English musician, comedian and artist known for fronting the band the Freshies in the late 1970s and early 1980s and for his comic persona Frank Sidebottom from 1984 onwards.

Sievey, under the guise of Sidebottom, made regular appearances on North West television throughout the late 1980s and early 1990s, even becoming a reporter for Granada Reports. Later, he presented Frank Sidebottom's Proper Telly Show in B/W for the Manchester-based television station Channel M. Throughout his career, Sidebottom made appearances on radio stations such as Manchester's Piccadilly Radio and on BBC Radio 1 and BBC Radio 5, alongside Mark and Lard.

Biography

Early life and career (1955–1976)
Sievey grew up in Ashton-on-Mersey, Sale, Cheshire (2.5 miles from Timperley). 

In 1969, when he was 14, Sievey began writing and recording his own music, and by the age of 15 was playing in local bands. In 1971, he hitch-hiked to London with his brother, staging a sit-in at the Apple Records HQ, demanding to see one of The Beatles. When they were asked to leave they insisted on recording something, and were booked into the studio after playing a song to head of A&R Tony King. Sievey subsequently recorded several demos, which he sent to record companies, receiving many rejection letters which he later compiled into a book. Unable to get a deal, he set up his own Razz label in 1974.

Sievey released two cassettes under his own name in 1975 and 1976 – Girl in My Blue Jeans and All Sleeps Secrets.

The Freshies (1977–1982) 
In 1977 Sievey formed the Freshies, with various other musicians involved including Martin Jackson, Billy Duffy and former Nosebleeds bassist Rick Sarko. A string of singles and several cassettes were released between 1978 and 1983. Most of these were credited to the Freshies, but were occasionally listed as Chris Sievey & the Freshies. In 1981, Sievey played on "Some Boys" by Going Red?, the band formed by former Jilted John star Graham Fellows. The Freshies biggest UK hit was "I'm in Love with the Girl on the Manchester Virgin Megastore Checkout Desk", released initially on his own Razz label (RAZZ 10), it was reissued by the US giant MCA Records with a slightly different title ("I'm in Love with the Girl on a Certain Manchester Megastore Checkout Desk") as there were objections about using the Virgin brand name. The record peaked at No 54. They had regional success in the Manchester area with "My Tape's Gone", "No Money" / "Oh Girl" and "Yellow Spot". 

Radio 1, and in particular Mike Read gave the Freshies a lot of airplay, especially the MCA release. After the "success" of "I'm in Love with the Girl on the Manchester Virgin Megastore Checkout Desk", the group released further singles, "Wrap Up the Rockets" and "I Can't Get 'Bouncing Babies' by the Teardrop Explodes", and although commercially successful in the Manchester area, they failed to make the national charts. They released 2 further cassettes, "Manchester Plays the Freshies" and "London Plays the Freshies", these were both essentially radio interviews with local and national DJs and concert recordings from each city. Chris had written his first LP by this stage, "The Johnny Radar Story", which, for various legal and contractual complications, was never released on vinyl. There are master copies on cassette in circulation though (albeit, very few).  In February of 1982, Sievey abandoned the quartet lineup of the Freshies, and reformed it as a duo with Barbara O'Donovan. The duo version of the Freshies released one single, "Fasten Your Seat Belts". In 1982, he released the mini-album Denigration Now, his first work outside of the Freshies since 1976's All Sleeps Secrets.

The following year he released a solo release, "Camouflage", with the A-side a song, and the B-side being computer programming.

Frank Sidebottom (1984–1994) 
The Frank Sidebottom character first appeared on an untitled 1984 EP by Chris Sievey & the Freshies, in a spoken-word track wherein Frank talks to Chris.

The character was instantly recognizable by his large spheroidal head, styled like an early Max Fleischer cartoon. This was initially made from papier-mâché, but later of fibreglass. In the documentary Being Frank, Martin Sievey (Chris's brother) states this was made using plaster of Paris.

Frank, usually dressed in a 1950s-style sharp suit, was portrayed as an aspiring pop star from the small village of Timperley, near Altrincham. His character was cheerfully optimistic, enthusiastic, and seemingly oblivious to his own failings. Although supposedly 35 years old (the age always attributed to Frank irrespective of the passage of time), he still lived at home with his mother, to whom he made frequent references. His mother was apparently unaware of her son's popularity. Frank sometimes had a sidekick in the form of "Little Frank", a hand puppet who was otherwise a perfect copy of Frank.

Comedy character Mrs Merton started out as Frank's sidekick on his radio show Radio Timperley, and the similarity of the characters is evident, exuding a sense of great ambition which belies a domestic lifestyle in the North of England. Sidebottom's former Oh Blimey Big Band members include Mark Radcliffe and Jon Ronson, and his driver was Chris Evans.

Immediately after creating the character, Sievey would record an in-character cover 'Material Boy', and send it to several major labels with the note ''I'm thinking of getting into showbiz. Do you have any pamphlets?" EMI were interested and offered him an interview. Chris appeared in character as Frank, and was signed to their sub-label Regal Zonophone. 

Zonophone released his third EP 'Frank's Sidebottom's Firm Favorites' in August of 1985. He'd previously self released two EPs as Frank in 1985, titled 'Frank's Summer Special' as well as an early version of 'Firm Favorites'. The EP reached 97 in the UK Charts on 31 August 1985 before dropping completely. In order to promote the EP, he made an appearance on the TV programme TX' the first of many appearances on the ITV network.

His second Zonophone EP, 'Oh Blimey, It's Christmas charted slightly higher than the first, at number 87, before dropping off again. It was likely the failure of his third Zonophone EP, Sci-Fi, that caused him to be dropped by the label. Afterwards he was signed to Marc Riley's In Tape label, on which he would release two albums and four EPs.

Despite the minimal chart success from these EPs, Frank had developed a cult following that allowed him to attract audiences upwards of 500 in Northern England and London. This act of extensively touring the country would develop Frank's status. Performances were often varied from straightforward stand-up comedy and featured novelty components such as tombola, and crowd interaction. Sometimes the show also included lectures. Contrasting with the alternative comedians of the time, Frank Sidebottom's comedy was family-friendly, if a little bizarre for some. This family friendly nature lead to Frank getting his own comic strip in the children's weekly comic Oink!, which launched 1986.

His backing band, dubbed 'The Oh Blimey Band' consisted of Mike Doherty on drums, Rick Sarko on guitar (both formerly of the Freshies), Patrick Gallagher on bass, and later, Jon Ronson on keyboards.

At the same time as touring, Frank would become a semi-regular cast member on the two final seasons of the ITV children's programme No. 73, eventually being grandfathered into its spin off, 7T3.

In 1987, Frank released his first album, a spoken word cassette called 'Fantastic Tales', released through his own 11:37 label. His first musical album, entitled '5:9:88', was released on vinyl by In Tape a year later. This album introduced the character Mrs Merton, portrayed by Caroline Aherne. Aherne continued to use the character as a comic persona, leading to her own TV show, launching the comedians TV career. Chris and the band, whilst disgruntled by the success of a character created for Frank now detached from Frank, did not resent it, with drummer Mike Doherty saying that while she had taken the characters name, she had crafted her own thing out of it. 

Frank was perhaps most popular in the North West of England, where his success was caught up in that of the Madchester scene, and for a time was a regular on regional ITV station Granada, even featuring as a reporter on its regional news programme, Granada Reports. 

Along his frequent television appearances, the Frank Sidebottom character also made appearances on radio, on stations such as Manchester's Piccadilly Radio and on BBC Radio 1 and BBC Radio 5, alongside Mark and Lard.

Jon Ronson first played with Frank's Oh Blimey Band in 1987, when their original keyboardist (Mark Radcliffe) was unable to make it to a gig at The Cricketers pub at Kennington Oval, London SE11. Ronson was social secretary at the Polytechnic of Central London and knew Mike Doherty as an agent. During the band introductions at the end of the show, Ronson noted a negative reaction to his presence, but found that his microphone had been almost completely muted, leaving him completely unheard by the audience. Despite this, one year later, he was offered a full time place in the band, which he accepted.

This same year Frank was included on the charity album Sgt. Pepper Knew My Father, which featured other acts like Michelle Shocked, the Christians, Sonic Youth, Billy Bragg, Hue and Cry, the Fall and Wet Wet Wet. He later recorded "Flying" for another Beatles tribute album, Revolution No. 9.

In 1989, Sievey re-arranged the Oh Blimey Band, introducing Richard Jones from the recently broken up local band the Desert Wolves on bass guitar, along with a new guitarist and saxophonist. Chris wanted to give the band a more professional sound, and booked a 30 date tour, the longest the band had ever undertook. This new lineup was a source of tension between the members, with Richard Jones and Jon Ronson taking a near instant disliking for each other. 

The tour and its new sound were panned by audience members and critics alike, leading to Sievey abandoning the new line-up in 1990, instead choosing to perform solo from then on.

After this, Frank began to make semi-regular guest appearances on the final season of ITV programme and No. 73 successor Motormouth, as well as numerous appearances on Channel 4, including the British version of the game show Remote Control which was presented by Tony Wilson, where each week he would pose "Frank's Fantastic Question" to the contestants. The popularity of these appearances lead to him getting his own show on the network, Frank Sidebottom's Fantastic Shed Show, which lasted one season in 1992. Afterwards he migrated to What's Up Doc?, where Sievey would not only portray Sidebottom, but also create the recurring segment Life with the Amoebas. After the first two seasons, Sievey left the show.

Retirement of Frank, stop-motion work and failed solo ventures (1995–2004) 
As the 1990s reached their midpoint, the Frank character began to make fewer public appearances before seemingly being retired. During this time, Sievey began working on a solo album entitled Life in 74 Minutes, which he later abandoned.  In 2000 he began working in stop motion animation and became a regular crew member on Seasons 4 - 6 of Bob the Builder, as well as a writer on the fourth season of Pingu.

In 2003, Chris began working on a new album, entitled Scilly Automatic. One track from this, "Lazy Rising More Slowly, Where R.U, Oh 'Chele'", was released on the 2019 outtakes and rarities compilation Being Frank.

Frank's comeback (2005–2010) 
Frank had faded into obscurity in the late 1990s, rarely appearing either on TV or making live appearances, but, a one-off performance at Manchester's Club Indigo Vs Manic Street Mania in December 2005 seemed to be the catalyst for a comeback.

In 2006, Frank reappeared in Greater Manchester on local television channel Channel M. His new show, Frank Sidebottom's Proper Telly Show in B/W, featured celebrity guests and animation. The first showing of each show was in black and white ("so you don't have to turn the colour down"), whilst subsequent repeats were shown in full colour. He also made five appearances on Iain Lee's programme on London's LBC as well as on numerous community radio stations such as Forever Manchester. Frank appeared as a test card shown late at night on Channel M, where he and Little Frank ramble on and sing songs whilst framed in a parody of the classic Test Card F. On 6 March 2007, in an episode of the Podge and Rodge Show on Ireland's RTÉ Two, he appeared in their 'Sham-Rock' talent section, performing a medley of songs by The Smiths. He received an overall score of 22 points from judges James Nesbitt and Glenda Gilson, putting him in first place for all the series' acts so far.

Frank starred in his own exhibition of drawings, animation and cardboard at London's Chelsea Space Gallery next to Tate Britain between 4 July and 4 August 2007. He also appeared at "Late" at Tate Britain on 3 August 2007.

He appeared in the Series 3 Christmas special of BBC Scotland's VideoGaiden, performing "Christmas is Really Fantastic", and later appeared on the Series 3 Awards show, and the final web-exclusive episode ("Closedown"). Frank appeared briefly as a Manchester United fan in an advert for the FIFA 10 video game in 2009.

Frank performed at Bloom Festival in 2007 and Kendal Calling in 2008. In late 2009 and early 2010 he supported John Cooper Clarke on a UK tour.

Frank's last professional appearance was at the Pyramid Arts Centre, Warrington on 4 June 2010. His last personal appearance was at the Salutation pub, Higher Chatham Street, Manchester on 11 June 2010 when he launched his World Cup single, "Three Shirts on the Line".

Following Sievey's death in June 2010, a social networking campaign was launched to gain Frank his first UK hit. "Guess Who's Been on Match of the Day" entered the charts at No. 66. In December 2010, Frank Sidebottom's 1986 song "Christmas Is Really Fantastic" was re-released in an attempt to become the Christmas number one.

Television work

Early appearances and No. 73 (1985–1988) 
Sievey's earliest television appearance was on the children's television show TX, with an in-character interview as Frank Sidebottom, shortly after the release of his first Zonophone EP. The following year, Sievey guest starred on the sixth season of British television series No 73, after which he, portraying Frank, would become a regular cast member for its final two seasons. Sievey would be carried over to the show's short-lived spin-off, 7T3, portraying Frank in two early episodes and a character called Reg in the latter half of the series. Reg is one of the few examples of Chris playing a character on television not related to Frank Sidebottom.

Frank Sidebottom's Fantastic Shed Show / What's Up Doc? (1989–1998) 
Three years following the end of 7T3, Frank became a regular cast member on the fourth, and final, season of the children's TV series Motormouth. After Motormouths cancellation, Frank was given his own show, titled Frank Sidebottom's Fantastic Shed Show, a television programme shown in 1992 featuring Chris Sievey as fictional character Frank Sidebottom. Guests included Caroline Aherne, Phil Cornwell, Midge Ure, Gerry Anderson, the Farm, Pop Will Eat Itself, Oceanic and Keith Chegwin. The show was produced by Dave Behrens for Yorkshire Television and was shown on ITV. The show only went on for one season. Following its conclusion, Sievey became a regular cast member on the first two seasons of What's Up Doc?. On the show, as well playing Frank, Sievey would also portray Mr. Fantastico, removed after the first season, and Life with the Amoebas.

Throughout the rest of the 1990s, Frank's television appearances would lessen, not attaching himself as a regular cast of anything, but making occasional appearances.

Bob the Builder and others (2000–2005) 
After retiring the character of Frank Sidebottom, Sievey became prop designer and set dresser on the fourth season of stop-motion animated series, Bob the Builder. Chris remained a crew member until the show's sixth season, but continued to work on the series' specials until 2005. In 2003, he became a writer on Fimbles, and then, in 2004, on the British revival of the Swiss stop motion programme Pingu.

Frank Sidebottom's Proper Telly Show / final appearances (2006–2008) 
In 2006, Sievey revived the character of Frank Sidebottom with the short lived television series, Frank Sidebottom's Proper Telly Show. Throughout 2007, Frank made several television appearances, before releasing his final project, Magical Timperley Tour, a short film featuring Frank touring 100 of his friends around the characters' home town of Timperley.

Filmography

Awards and honours

Sievey was posthumously recognized with the special judges' award at the 2011 Chortle Awards. A publicly funded statue of Frank by Colin Spofforth was unveiled on 20 October 2013 at 11:37 in Timperley village, the timing a reference to one of the character's catchphrases.

Death and legacy 
Sievey was diagnosed with cancer in May 2010, and died at Wythenshawe Hospital on 21 June 2010 at the age of 54 after collapsing at his home in Hale, Greater Manchester. Sievey left a daughter, Asher, and two sons: Stirling and Harry (1992–2017). After it was reported that Sievey had died virtually penniless and was facing a pauper's funeral provided by state grants, a grassroots movement on various social networking websites raised £6,500 in a matter of hours. The appeal closed on Monday 28 June with a final balance of £21,631.55 from 1,632 donations.

Sievey's funeral was held on 2 July 2010 at Altrincham Crematorium. The private service was attended by more than 200 members of his family, friends and former colleagues.

On 8 July 2010, over 5,000 fans of Frank Sidebottom gathered for a party at the Castlefield Arena in Manchester to celebrate Sievey's life. The acts included Badly Drawn Boy and surviving members of Frank's Oh Blimey Big Band who played in tribute.

From 1 March to 30 April 2019, Manchester Central Library held an exhibition Bobbins: Frank Sidebottom and Chris Sievey, which featured never-before-seen items from Sievey’s archives, from puppets to home videos to personal artefacts. The exhibition covered both Frank Sidebottom as well as Sievey's other creative endeavours.

It was announced in April 2019 that GCHQ had cracked the hidden codes and messages that Sievey had left around the borders of his Frank Sidebottom books and recordings.

On the Led Zeppelin bootleg "Bonzo's Last Stand", the back of the album has text which states, "Produced by Frank Sidebottom." While an obvious reference to the character, it also is a joking reference to Led Zeppelin guitarist/founder Jimmy Page, who produced all of their albums. He stands off to the side and at the bottom of the back cover photo.

Film
The 2014 film Frank was largely inspired by the Frank Sidebottom character, telling the story of a young wannabe musician who joins a group led by the enigmatic Frank (Michael Fassbender). The film was written by Jon Ronson and Peter Straughan, and was based on Ronson's experiences playing in Sievey's Oh Blimey Big Band. Although drawing from Ronson's memoir, the story is set in contemporary Ireland and America, and the Frank character combines elements of Sievey with Daniel Johnston and Captain Beefheart.

In 2014, a feature-length documentary about the life and art of Chris Sievey, entitled Being Frank: The Chris Sievey Story was announced and was released in March 2019. It is directed by Steve Sullivan, and was funded through a successful Kickstarter campaign. The film documents Sievey's entire life, including his band The Freshies and his creation of the Frank Sidebottom character, and features interviews with many of Chris Sievey's family and colleagues with exclusive access to Chris' own personal archive of home movies, diaries, notebooks, props and costumes.

Books
Jon Ronson, who worked with Sievey, published Frank: The True Story that Inspired the Movie in 2014, a memoir of his time in the Frank Sidebottom Oh Blimey Big Band.

A biography of Chris Sievey was written by Manchester author Mick Middles, and was published in November 2014.

Discography

Solo/as Chris Sievey

Albums

Singles

EPs

Videos
Denigration Now VHS Video (1982), Razz

Video games
Flying Train EMI (1983)
The Biz Virgin Games (1984)

with/as The Freshies

Frank Sidebottom

Albums

Compilations

EPs

Singles

Videos
Frank Sidebottom's Fantastic Shed Show (1992)
Frank's World (2007)

References

External links 

 Radio Timperley Podcasts
 FranksWorld.co.uk Official site
 Frank's Myspace
 Little-Frank.co.uk
 Still from Frank movie

1955 births
2010 deaths
1990s British television series
Deaths from cancer in England
English male comedians
English male singers
English record producers
People from Sale, Greater Manchester
20th-century English comedians
21st-century English comedians
Masked musicians